Javier Peterson Cardona (born September 15, 1975) is a former Major League Baseball (MLB) catcher. He played in MLB with the Detroit Tigers (2000 to 2001) and the San Diego Padres (2002). In 1999, he was named the Tigers Minor League Player of the Year.

See also
 List of Major League Baseball players from Puerto Rico

References

External links

1975 births
Living people
Major League Baseball catchers
Major League Baseball players from Puerto Rico
Detroit Tigers players
San Diego Padres players
Jamestown Jammers players
Lakeland Tigers players
Jacksonville Suns players
Toledo Mud Hens players
Portland Beavers players
West Tennessee Diamond Jaxx players
Norfolk Tides players
Tulsa Drillers players
Memphis Redbirds players
Akron Aeros players
Buffalo Bisons (minor league) players
Long Island Ducks players
Pennsylvania Road Warriors players
Lake Land Lakers baseball players
Binghamton Mets players
Cangrejeros de Santurce (baseball) players
Fayetteville Generals players
Indios de Mayagüez players